LifeAct Dye is a dye composed of a 17 amino acid recombinant peptide that stains filamentous actin (F-actin) structures of eukaryotic living or fixed cells. The dye is a registered trademark of ibidi GmbH. There are several types and combinations of the dye that can be utilized depending on the cell type, protocol, and purpose of the analysis.

Types 

 LifeAct Plasmid
 LifeAct mRNA
 LifeAct Adenovirus
 LifeAct Lentivirus
 LifeAct Protein

Chemistry 
LifeAct-TagGFP2 being the most widely used dye compared to other LifeAct constructs is composed of the first 17 amino acid from the Saccharomyces cerevisiae Abp140, an actin-binding protein. The Abp140 is highly conserved among Saccharomyces cerevisiae and other closely related organisms. It is introduced as a dye but is actually a localisation marker for actin. The 17 amino acid fragment of Abp140 was genetically fused to GFP and fluoresces green when it binds the F-actin structures of living and fixed cells, allowing for visualization of cell mechanics under microscopes.  Previous experiments involving the analysis of cell mechanics had depended on fluorescently labeled phalloidin and actin GFP fusion proteins obtained from utrophin in Xenopus laevis and ABP120 in Dictyostelium discoideum. However, due to their large protein size, markers such as phalloidin and GFP fusion proteins are limited to cells that can be transfected and tend to compete with their orthologous protein. These localization markers, often referred to as dyes, affect cellular mechanical properties and F-actin structures, thus making these markers unreliable. An alternative to these markers is Life Act-TagGFP2, which is a much smaller protein and does not affect cell mechanics. Cells synthesize LifeAct-TagGFP2 in a short period of time at a cost-effective making it suitable as an in vivo marker.

Applications in biomedical research 
LifeAct dyes have been used as a universal marker for F-actin visualization in biomedical research. An experiment conducted by Sawant et al. utilized LifeAct GFP to visualize the migration of control border cells in the ovaries of Drosophila  flies, in order to determine how cells move in terms of small and large collectives during development and cancer. The dye that labels F-actin in border cells and adjacent follicle cells allowed for the detailed examination of border cell membranes and protrusions. Studies regarding the degradation of actin cytoskeleton due to aging relied on LifeAct dyes for the analysis of cytoskeletal organization as a function of age. Transgenic lines that expressed the LifeAct dye in various tissues of C. elegans were primarily used for imaging.

References 

Protein imaging